Péter Gothár (born 28 August 1947) is a Hungarian film director and screenwriter. He has directed 23 films since 1974. His film The Outpost was screened in the Un Certain Regard section at the 1995 Cannes Film Festival.

Selected filmography
 Time Stands Still (1982)
 The Outpost (1995)
 Vaska Easoff (1996)

References

External links

1947 births
Living people
Hungarian film directors
Hungarian screenwriters
Male screenwriters
Hungarian male writers
Hungarian male film actors
People from Pécs